North Macedonia (known simply as Macedonia 1991–2019) has submitted 18 films for the Academy Award for Best International Feature Film since 1994. The Macedonians also attempted unsuccessfully to submit a film in 1991, while they were in the process of trying to achieve international recognition as an independent state. Prior to independence, Macedonian filmmakers were active participants in the Yugoslavian film industry, and several films made by Macedonian filmmakers were submitted for Oscar consideration as part of Yugoslavia. The last instance of this was Stole Popov's Happy New Year '49 in 1987.

The International Feature Film award is handed out annually by the United States Academy of Motion Picture Arts and Sciences to a feature-length motion picture produced outside the United States that contains primarily non-English dialogue. It was not created until the 1956 Academy Awards, in which a competitive Academy Award of Merit, known as the Best Foreign Language Film Award, was created for non-English speaking films, and has been given annually since.

, two Macedonian films, Milcho Manchevski's Before the Rain and Tamara Kotevska's and Ljubomir Stefanov's Honeyland, have been nominated for the Academy Award for Best Foreign Language Film, and no Macedonian film has won the award. Another of Mančevski's films, Shadows, was submitted to the Academy for the 80th Academy Awards, but it failed to get an Oscar nomination. Films by Ivo Trajkov have also been selected to represent North Macedonia three times.

Submissions
The Academy of Motion Picture Arts and Sciences has invited the film industries of various countries to submit their best film for the Academy Award for Best Foreign Language Film since 1956. The Foreign Language Film Award Committee oversees the process and reviews all the submitted films. Following this, they vote via secret ballot to determine the five nominees for the award. Below is a list of the films that have been submitted by North Macedonia for review by the Academy for the award by year and the respective Academy Awards ceremony.

See also
List of Yugoslavian submissions for Academy Award for Best Foreign Language Film
List of Academy Award winners and nominees for Best Foreign Language Film
List of Academy Award-winning foreign language films

Notes

References

External links
The Official Academy Awards Database
The Motion Picture Credits Database
IMDb Academy Awards Page

North Macedonia

Academy Award